Wilhelm Kaipel (born 20 November 1948) is an Austrian former footballer and coach.

References

External links
 personal page
 

1948 births
Living people
Association football goalkeepers
Austrian footballers
Austrian football managers
Wiener Sport-Club players
FC Red Bull Salzburg players
SK Rapid Wien managers